{{Speciesbox
| image = 
| status = LC
| status_system = IUCN3.1
| status_ref = <ref name="iucn status 11 November 2021">{{cite iucn |authors= Rivas, G. & Schargel, W. |date=2016 |title='Tropidurus bogerti |volume=2016|page=e.T49845510A49845514|url=https://www.iucnredlist.org/species/49845510/49845514 |access-date=16 December 2021}}</ref> 
| genus = Tropidurus
| species = bogerti
| authority = Roze, 1958
}}Tropidurus bogerti'',  the keeled lava lizard, is a species of lizard of the Tropiduridae family. It is found in Venezuela.

References

Tropidurus
Reptiles described in 1958
Reptiles of Venezuela
Endemic fauna of Venezuela
Taxa named by Janis Roze